Berdiansk is a port city in the eponymous municipality on the Sea of Azov in the eponymous raion of Zaporizhzhia Oblast, Ukraine.

Berdiansk or Berdyansk may also refer to:

Places 

 Berdiansk Municipality, in Berdiansk Raion, Zaporizhzhia Oblast, Ukraine
 Berdiansk Raion, Zaporizhzhia Oblast, Ukraine
 Berdyansky Uyezd, Taurida Governorate, Empire of Russia
 Berdiansk Airport, an airport in Berdiansk
 Berdyansk Spit, a spit on the Sea of Azov
 Berdyansk Bay, a gulf of the Sea of Azov between Berdyansk Spit and Obytochna Spit

Other uses 

 Battle of Berdiansk (2022) during the Russian invasion of Ukraine

See also